The following are the national records in Olympic weightlifting in American Samoa. Records are maintained in each weight class for the snatch lift, clean and jerk lift, and the total for both lifts by the Weightlifting Association of American Samoa.

Current records

Men

Women

Historical records

Men (1998–2018)

Women (1998–2018)

References

External links

Weightlifting
American Samoa
American Samoa
Olympic weightlifting